Jackson High School is a public high school in Jackson, Ohio, United States.  It is the only high school in the Jackson City School District.  Their mascot is the Ironmen and their school colors are red and white.

Athletics
The Jackson Ironmen are currently in the Frontier Athletic Conference, a new league as of the fall of 2017. They are alongside Hillsboro, Washington Courthouse, Miami Trace, Chillicothe, and Greenfield Union High Schools.

Jackson High School has a variety of sports programs including baseball, cross country, football, golf, bowling, soccer, softball, tennis, track and field, and volleyball.

References

External links
 District website

High schools in Jackson County, Ohio
Public high schools in Ohio
High School